Spain participated in the Eurovision Song Contest 2015 with the song "Amanecer" written by Tony Sánchez-Ohlsson, Peter Boström and Thomas G:son. The song was performed by Edurne, who was selected by Spanish broadcaster Televisión Española (TVE) to represent the nation at the 2015 contest in Vienna, Austria. Edurne was announced as the Spanish representative on 14 January 2015, while "Amanecer" were presented to the public as the Spanish entry on 1 March 2015.

As a member of the "Big Five", Spain automatically qualified to compete in the final of the Eurovision Song Contest. Performing in position 21, Spain placed twenty-first out of the 27 participating countries with 15 points.

Background 

The nation has won the contest on two occasions: in 1968 with the song "La, la, la" performed by Massiel and in 1969 with the song "Vivo cantando" performed by Salomé, the latter having won in a four-way tie with France, the Netherlands and the United Kingdom. Spain has also finished second four times, with Karina in 1971, Mocedades in 1973, Betty Missiego in 1979 and Anabel Conde in 1995. In 2014, Spain placed tenth with the song "Dancing in the Rain" performed by Ruth Lorenzo.

The Spanish national broadcaster, Televisión Española (TVE), broadcasts the event within Spain and organises the selection process for the nation's entry. TVE confirmed their intentions to participate at the 2015 Eurovision Song Contest on 15 September 2014. In 2014, TVE organised a national final featuring a competition among several artists and songs to select both the artist and song that would represent Spain. For their 2015 entry, the broadcaster opted to select both the artist and song via an internal selection.

Before Eurovision

Internal selection
In December 2014, Spanish media reported that TVE had selected singer Edurne to represent Spain in Vienna. Edurne previously participated in the fourth series of the reality television music competition Operación Triunfo where she placed sixth. Edurne also participated in the third season of reality television music competition Tu cara me suena where she was the winner. Other artists rumoured in the Spanish press included Diana Navarro, Marta Sánchez and Pablo Alborán.

On 14 January 2015, the broadcaster held a press conference at the TVE Sala de Comunicación Torrespaña Headquarters in Madrid, hosted by Ignacio Gómez-Acebo, where they confirmed Edurne as the Spanish entrant. During the press conference, it was also revealed that Edurne would sing the song "Amanecer", written by Tony Sánchez-Ohlsson, Peter Boström and Thomas G:son. Sánchez-Ohlsson and G:son had previously co-written the Spanish entries in 2007 and 2012. The official video of "Amanecer", directed by David Arnal and Germán de la Hoz, was filmed in January 2015 in Valencia. The song premiered on 1 March 2015 on RTVE's website, while the video was released on 9 March 2015. The music video served as the official preview video for the Spanish entry.

Preparation
Edurne's pre-contest promotion for "Amanecer" was focused in Spain, including a performance of the song on the talk show Alaska y Segura on La 1 on 6 April. On 15 April, it was announced that "Amanecer" would be the official song of the 2015 Vuelta a España. On 22 April, a promotional symphonic version of "Amanecer" was released, which was recorded with the RTVE Symphony Orchestra and chorus at Madrid's Teatro Monumental.

At Eurovision 
According to Eurovision rules, all nations with the exceptions of the host country and the "Big Five" (France, Germany, Italy, Spain and the United Kingdom) are required to qualify from one of two semi-finals in order to compete for the final; the top ten countries from each semi-final progress to the final. In the 2015 contest, Australia also competed directly in the final as an invited guest nation. As a member of the "Big Five", Spain automatically qualified to compete in the final on 23 May 2015. In addition to their participation in the final, Spain is also required to broadcast and vote in one of the two semi-finals. During the semi-final allocation draw on 26 January 2015, Spain was assigned to broadcast and vote in the first semi-final on 19 May 2015.

In Spain, the semi-finals were broadcast on La 2 and the final was broadcast on La 1 with commentary by José María Íñigo and Julia Varela. The Spanish spokesperson, who announced the Spanish votes during the final, was Lara Siscar.

Final
Edurne took part in technical rehearsals on 17 and 20 May, followed by dress rehearsals on 22 and 23 May. This included the jury final on 22 May where the professional juries of each country watched and voted on the competing entries. After technical rehearsals were held on 20 May, the "Big 5" countries, host country Austria and guest country Australia held a press conference. As part of this press conference, the artists took part in a draw to determine which half of the grand final they would subsequently participate in. Spain was drawn to compete in the second half. Following the conclusion of the second semi-final, the shows' producers decided upon the running order of the final. The running order for the semi-finals and final was decided by the shows' producers rather than through another draw, so that similar songs were not placed next to each other. Spain was subsequently placed to perform in position 21, following the entry from Romania and before the entry from Hungary.

The Spanish performance featured Edurne on stage wearing a long red cloak which was removed to reveal a gold dress designed by José Fuentes, joined by dancer Giuseppe Di Bella. The performers did an acrobatic dance routine choreographed by Miryam Benedited Arce, which included Edurne beginning the performance by laying down on a pedestal at the centre of the stage and holding Di Bella in her arms. In regards to the performance, the head of the Spanish delegation Federico Llanos stated: "The moment captured by Edurne's song "Amanecer" is sunrise. Last minutes of a battle between the darkness and the light. She thinks about all the memories, fighting against all the bad things happened in her life. So, she struggles with her past, hoping to be able to continue with her life. It's all about the battle, right before the sunrise. That excitement is what the song and her performance is all about." The stage lighting transitioned from dark colours to bright yellow, and the LED screens displayed rain, waterfalls and arid landscapes. Spain placed twenty-first in the final, scoring 15 points.

Voting
Voting during the three shows consisted of 50 percent public televoting and 50 percent from a jury deliberation. The jury consisted of five music industry professionals who were citizens of the country they represent, with their names published before the contest to ensure transparency. This jury was asked to judge each contestant based on: vocal capacity; the stage performance; the song's composition and originality; and the overall impression by the act. In addition, no member of a national jury could be related in any way to any of the competing acts in such a way that they cannot vote impartially and independently. The individual rankings of each jury member were released shortly after the grand final.

Following the release of the full split voting by the EBU after the conclusion of the competition, it was revealed that Spain had placed twentieth with the public televote and twenty-fifth with the jury vote. In the public vote, Spain scored 27 points and in the jury vote the nation scored 6 points.

Below is a breakdown of points awarded to Spain and awarded by Spain in the first semi-final and grand final of the contest, and the breakdown of the jury voting and televoting conducted during the two shows:

Points awarded to Spain

Points awarded by Spain

Detailed voting results
The following members comprised the Spanish jury:
  (jury chairperson)songwriter, producer
 Daniel Digessinger, actor, represented Spain in the 2010 contest
 Rosa Lópezsinger, represented Spain in the 2002 contest
 Ruth Lorenzosinger, represented Spain in the 2014 contest
 Pastora Solersinger, represented Spain in the 2012 contest

References

2015
Countries in the Eurovision Song Contest 2015
Eurovision
Eurovision